The  1943 German football championship, the 36th edition of the competition, was won by Dresdner SC, the club's first-ever championship, won by defeating FV Saarbrücken in the final.

The twenty-nine 1942–43 Gauliga champions, four more than in the previous season, competed in a single-leg knock out competition to determine the national champion. In the following season, the last completed one during the war, the German championship was played with thirty one clubs, expanded through a combination of territorial expansion of Nazi Germany and the sub-dividing of the Gauligas in later years.

The 1943 championship marked the end of the golden era of Schalke 04 which had reached the semi-finals of each edition of the national championship from 1932 to 1942 and won the competition in 1934, 1935, 1937, 1939, 1940 and 1942 while losing the final in 1933, 1938 and 1941. In 1943 defending champions Schalke was knocked out in the quarter finals by Holstein Kiel, thereby ending the clubs quest for a twelfth consecutive semi-finals appearance.

Ernst Kalwitzki of FC Schalke 04 and Herbert Binkert of 1. FC Saarbrücken were the joint top scorers for the 1943 championship with five goals each, the lowest for any top scorer since 1925. For Kalwitzki it was the third and last time, after 1937 and 1939, to finish as top scorer.

Dresdner SC became the last club to be awarded the Viktoria, the annual trophy for the German champions from 1903 to 1944. The trophy disappeared during the final stages of the war, did not resurface until after the German reunification and was put on display at the DFB headquarters in Frankfurt until 2015, when it was moved to the new Deutsches Fußballmuseum in Dortmund.

Dresdner SC completed the 1942–43 season unbeaten, finishing the Gauliga Sachsen with 18 wins out of 18 games, and winning all five games in the championship to claim the title.

Qualified teams
The teams qualified through the 1942–43 Gauliga season:

 Gauliga champions LSV Adler Deblin were replaced by SG Warschau.
 Stuttgarter Kickers and VfB Stuttgart finished on equal points and the same goal average and were therefore declared joint champions but only VfB advanced to the German championship.

Competition

Qualifying round

|}

First round
Holstein Kiel, SpVgg Wilhelmshaven, Kickers Offenbach and Westende Hamborn received a bye for the first round.

|align="center" style="background:#ddffdd" colspan=3|2 May 1943

|}

Replay

|align="center" style="background:#ddffdd" colspan=3|9 May 1943

|}

Round of 16

|align="center" style="background:#ddffdd" colspan=3|16 May 1943

|}
 VfB Königsberg was disqualified and replaced by SV Neufahrwasser in the quarter finals.

Quarter-finals

Semi-finals

Third place play-off

Final

References

Sources
 kicker Allmanach 1990, by kicker, page 164 & 177 - German championship

External links
 German Championship 1942–43 at weltfussball.de 
 German Championship 1943 at RSSSF

1
German
German football championship seasons